Lahat may refer to:
Lahat, Malaysia, a town near the city of Ipoh, Malaysia
Lahat, Sumatra, an administrative district and a town which is the capital of Lahat Regency, South Sumatra, Indonesia
LAHAT, an anti-tank guided missile manufactured by Israel Aerospace Industries